This page is meant to provide clarity on the mechanisms and timeline of the transfer of Rupert's Land and North-Western Territory from the Hudson's Bay Company (HBC) back to the Crown and then immediately to the new nation of Canada.

References 

States and territories established in 1870
Rupert's Land
Canadian timelines
History of the Northwest Territories